Below is a partial list of Minor League Baseball players in the Los Angeles Angels system.

Players

Coleman Crow

Coleman McCade Crow (born December 30, 2000) is an American professional baseball pitcher in the Los Angeles Angels organization.

Crow attended Pike County High School in Zebulon, Georgia. He was drafted by the Los Angeles Angels in the 28th round of the 2019 Major League Baseball Draft. He made his professional debut in 2021 with the Inland Empire 66ers and played in the Arizona Fall League after the season.

Crow started 2022 with the Rocket City Trash Pandas.

Mason Erla

Mason Erla (born August 19, 1997) is an American baseball pitcher in the Los Angeles Angels organization.

Erla played college baseball at Michigan State for five seasons. He pitched in two games as a freshman before tearing the Latissimus dorsi muscle in his pitching shoulder and using a medical redshirt. In 2018, he briefly played collegiate summer baseball with the Yarmouth–Dennis Red Sox of the Cape Cod Baseball League. Erla went 2-0 four starts before the 2020 season was cut short due to the coronavirus pandemic. As a redshirt junior, he had a 5-6 record with a 3.50 ERA 80 strikeouts.

Erla was selected in the 17th round by the Los Angeles Angels in the 2021 Major League Baseball draft. After signing with the team he was assigned to the Arizona Complex League Angels and made two appearances before being promoted to the High-A Tri-City Dust Devils. Erla was assigned to the Double-A Rocket City Trash Pandas at the start of the 2022 season. After his first start, Erla was placed on the injured list due to shoulder soreness and did not return for six weeks.

Michigan State Spartans bio

Denzer Guzman

Denzer Guzman (born February 8, 2004) is a Dominican professional baseball shortstop in the Los Angeles Angels organization.

On January 15, 2021, Guzman signed with the Angels as an international prospect for $2 million. He was first assigned to the rookie-level Dominican Summer League Angels on June 8, 2021. In 44 DSL games, Guzman batted .213 with three home runs and 27 RBIs.

On June 6, 2022, Guzman was assigned to the rookie-level Arizona Complex League Angels. In 52 games, Guzman batted .286 with three home runs and 33 RBIs. On August 25, he was promoted to the Single A Inland Empire 66ers of the California League. In five games with Inland Empire, Guzman went 3-for-17 (.176) with two RBIs.

Kolton Ingram

Kolton Reed Ingram (born October 21, 1996) is an American professional baseball pitcher in the Los Angeles Angels organization.

Ingram played college baseball at Columbus State University. He was drafted by the Detroit Tigers in the 37th round of the 2019 Major League Baseball Draft. In March 2021, he signed a minor league deal with the Los Angeles Angels.

The Angels added Ingram to their 40-man roster after the 2022 season. Ingram was optioned to the Triple-A Salt Lake Bees to start the 2023 season.

Jeremiah Jackson

Jeremiah Jackson (born March 26, 2000) is an American professional baseball shortstop in the Los Angeles Angels organization.

Jackson attended St. Luke's Episcopal School in Mobile, Alabama, where he played baseball. He committed to play college baseball at Mississippi State University prior to his sophomore year. As a senior in 2018, he batted .637 with 15 home runs and 49 RBIs in 34 games, and was named Alabama Mr. Baseball. After his senior year, he was selected by the Los Angeles Angels in the second round (57th overall) of the 2018 Major League Baseball draft.

Jackson signed with the Angels and made his professional debut that year with the Rookie-level Arizona League Angels before being promoted to the Orem Owls of the Rookie Advanced Pioneer League. Over 43 games between the two clubs, he batted .254 with seven home runs, 23 RBIs and ten stolen bases. In 2019, he returned to Orem, slashing .266/.333/.605 with 23 home runs and sixty RBIs over 65 games, earning Pioneer League All-Star honors. His 23 home runs tied the Pioneer League single-season record. He did not play a minor league game in 2020 due to the cancellation of the minor league season caused by the COVID-19 pandemic.

Jackson was assigned to the Inland Empire 66ers of the Low-A West for the 2021 season. He missed over two months due to a quad strain. Over 45 games with the 66ers, Jackson slashed .263/.352/.527 with eight home runs and 46 RBIs. He was selected to play in the Arizona Fall League for the Glendale Desert Dogs after the season. He was assigned to the Rocket City Trash Pandas of the Double-A Southern League to begin the 2022 season. After two games, he was placed on the injured list. He returned in late May. Over 87 games with Rocket City, he batted .215 with 14 home runs and 44 RBIs.

Brett Kerry

Brett Dustin Kerry (born April 12, 1999) is an American professional baseball pitcher in the Los Angeles Angels organization.

Born and raised in Clemmons, North Carolina, Kerry began his high school career at West Forsyth High School in Clemmons before transferring to Wesleyan Christian Academy in High Point, North Carolina. He went 10-1 with a 0.60 ERA as a senior in 2018. Unselected in the 2018 Major League Baseball draft, he enrolled at the University of South Carolina to play college baseball for the Gamecocks.

As a freshman at South Carolina in 2019, Kerry made 22 appearances (with two starts), going 4-1 with a 2.62 ERA, 65 strikeouts, and seven saves over  innings. After pitching only 15 innings in 2020 due to the COVID-19 pandemic, he spent the summer playing for the Lexington County Blowfish of the Coastal Plain League. For the 2021 season, Kerry made 17 appearances with three starts and went 5-1 with a 2.15 ERA and 84 strikeouts over  innings. Following the season, he was selected by the Los Angeles Angels in the fifth round of the 2021 Major League Baseball draft.

Kerry signed with the Angels and spent his first professional season with the Inland Empire 66ers of the Low-A West and the Rocket City Trash Pandas of the Double-A South, posting a 1.26 ERA over five starts and  innings. He returned to Rocket City for the 2022 season. Over 25 games (twenty starts), he went 5-7 with a 4.46 ERA and 118 strikeouts over 103 innings.

South Carolina Gamecocks bio

Jake Madden

Jake Madden (born December 26, 2001) is an American baseball pitcher in the Los Angeles Angels organization.

Madden grew up in Harrisburg, Pennsylvania and attended East Pennsboro High School. He committed to play college baseball at South Carolina from 15 scholarship offers during his junior year. Madden tore his ulnar collateral ligament in his senior season and continued to play as East Pennsboro's designated hitter. He decommitted from South Carolina in the summer after his senior year and instead enrolled at Northwest Florida State College.

Madden redshirted his first season at Northwest Florida while recovering from Tommy John surgery to repair his elbow injury. He committed to transfer to Alabama for his remaining collegiate eligibility prior to his sophomore season. As a redshirt freshman, Madden went 4-4 with a 4.53 ERA and 76 strikeouts in  innings pitched. He dealt with blister issues on his pitching hand throughout the season.

Madden was selected in the fourth round by the Los Angeles Angels in the 2022 Major League Baseball draft. He signed with the Angels on July 22, 2022, for an over-slot signing bonus of $997,500.

Northwest Florida State Raiders bio

Landon Marceaux

Landon Joel Marceaux (born October 8, 1999) is an American professional baseball pitcher in the Los Angeles Angels organization.

Marceaux attended Destrehan High School in Destrehan, Louisiana, where he played baseball. As a junior in 2017, he pitched to a 1.56 ERA and 99 strikeouts over  innings. That summer, he played for USA Baseball on their U-18 team that won a gold medal at the U-18 Baseball World Cup. As a senior in 2018, he went 5-0 with a 1.26 ERA, five walks, and 76 strikeouts over  innings. He was ranked a top-40 draft prospect by Major League Baseball, and received an offer for $1.5 million from the Kansas City Royals as their third round selection in the 2018 Major League Baseball draft, but declined. He was then selected by the New York Yankees in the 37th round of the draft but did not sign and instead enrolled at Louisiana State University to play college baseball for the LSU Tigers.

Marceaux was inserted into LSU's starting rotation as a freshman in 2019 and made 14 starts on the year. He finished the season 5-2 with a 4.66 ERA and 43 strikeouts over 58 innings pitched. During his sophomore year in 2020, he went 2-0 with a 2.70 ERA over four starts before the remainder of the college baseball season was cancelled due to the COVID-19 pandemic. As a junior in 2021, he opened the season with  innings in which he did not give up an earned run. He finished the season having started 17 games and went 7-7 with a 2.54 ERA and 116 strikeouts over  innings. He was selected by the Los Angeles Angels in the third round with the 80th overall selection in the 2021 Major League Baseball draft. He signed with the team for $767,800.

Marceaux made his professional debut that season with the Arizona Complex League Angels, giving up six earned runs over  innings. He opened the 2022 season with the Tri-City Dust Devils and was promoted to the Rocket City Trash Pandas in early August. Over 18 starts between the two teams, he went 4-6 with a 2.98 ERA and 73 strikeouts over  innings.

LSU Tigers bio

Luke Murphy

Luke Evan Murphy (born November 5, 1999) is an American professional baseball pitcher in the Los Angeles Angels organization.

Murphy attended East Robertson High School in Cross Plains, Tennessee and played college baseball at Vanderbilt University. He was drafted by the Los Angeles Angels in the fourth round of the 2021 Major League Baseball draft.

Murphy made his professional debut with the Tri-City Dust Devils. He started 2022 with the Rocket City Trash Pandas.

Braden Olthoff

Braden Richard Olthoff (born March 12, 1999) is an American professional baseball pitcher in the Los Angeles Angels organization.

Olthoff attended El Camino High School in Oceanside, California and played college baseball at Palomar College and Tulane University. During his first year at Tulane in 2020, he started four games and went 4-0 with a 0.32 ERA over 28 innings before the season was cancelled due to the COVID-19 pandemic. He returned to the starting rotation in 2021. He finished the season 6-3 with a 3.78 ERA, 91 strikeouts, and 11 walks, and was selected by the Los Angeles Angels in the ninth round of the 2021 Major League Baseball draft.

Olthoff signed with the Angels, and split his first professional season between the Arizona Complex League Angels and Inland Empire 66ers. Over five starts, he went 0-2 with a 5.94 ERA and 26 strikeouts over  innings pitched. He opened the 2022 season with the Tri-City Dust Devils and was promoted to the Rocket City Trash Pandas in late May. Over 23 games (17 starts) between the two teams, he posted a 5-9 record with a 4.15 ERA and 73 strikeouts over  innings.

Tulane Green Wave bio

Kyren Paris

 Kyren Terrell Paris (born November 11, 2001) is an American professional baseball shortstop in the Los Angeles Angels organization.

Paris attended Freedom High School in Oakley, California. He was drafted by the Los Angeles Angels in the second round of the 2019 Major League Baseball draft. He signed with the Angels rather than play college baseball at the University of California, Berkley.

Paris made his professional debut with the Arizona League Angels with whom he appeared in three games. He did not play a minor league game in 2020 because the season was cancelled due to the COVID-19 pandemic. He started 2021 with the Inland Empire 66ers before being promoted to the Tri-City Dust Devils. Over 47 games between the two teams, he slashed .267/.388/.459 with four home runs, 25 RBIs, and 22 stolen bases. He missed two months due to a fractured fibula.

Edgar Quero

Edgar Quero (born April 6, 2003) is a Cuban professional baseball catcher in the Los Angeles Angels organization.

Quero signed with the Los Angeles Angels as an international free agent in February 2021 and received a $200,000 signing bonus. He was assigned to the Rookie-level Arizona Complex League Angels to begin his professional career and was later promoted to the Low-A Inland Empire 66ers and batted .240 with five home runs for the 2021 season. Quero returned to Inland Empire to begin the 2022 season. On June 13, Quero earned his first Prospect Team of the Week selection after going 7-for-18 (.389) with two home runs and eight runs batted in (RBI). On July 18, he earned another selection after going 11-for-23 (.478) with one home run and three RBI. On August 8, Quero earned his third selection to the weekly team after he went 10-for-25 (.400) with two home runs and eight RBI. On August 17, Quero was ranked as the third-best prospect in the Angels farm system, behind organizational newcomers Logan O'Hoppe and Zach Neto.

Ryan Smith

Ryan William Smith (born August 13, 1997) is an American professional baseball pitcher in the Los Angeles Angels organization.

Smith attended Garden City High School in Garden City, New York, and played college baseball at Princeton University. In 2018, he played collegiate summer baseball with the Cotuit Kettleers of the Cape Cod Baseball League. As a senior at Princeton in 2019, he pitched  innings, compiling a 3.45 ERA and 76 strikeouts. He was selected by the Los Angeles Angels in the 18th round of the 2019 Major League Baseball draft.

Smith signed with the Angels and made his professional debut with the Orem Owlz of the Rookie Advanced Pioneer League, going 0–2 with a 5.26 ERA over  innings. He did not play a game in 2020 after the minor league season was cancelled due to the COVID-19 pandemic. Smith began the 2021 season with the Inland Empire 66ers of the Low-A West and earned promotions to the Tri-City Dust Devils of the High-A West, the Rocket City Trash Pandas of the Double-A South, and the Salt Lake Bees of the Triple-A West during the season. Over 24 games (23 starts) between the four clubs, Smith went 7–7 with a 4.24 ERA and 153 strikeouts over  innings. He returned to Salt Lake for the 2022 season. Over 32 games (ten starts), he went 2-6 with a 6.75 ERA and 81 strikeouts over  innings.

José Soriano

José Joaquín Soriano (born October 20, 1998) is a Dominican professional baseball pitcher for the Los Angeles Angels organization.

Soriano signed with the Los Angeles Angels as an international free agent for a $70,000 signing bonus on March 4, 2016. He made his professional debut with the DSL Angels, logging a 3–5 record and 1.58 ERA in 14 games. The next season, Soriano split the year between the Rookie-level AZL Angels and the Rookie-level Orem Owlz, recording a cumulative 2–2 record and 4.13 ERA in 13 appearances. In 2018, Soriano played for the Single-A Burlington Bees, posting a 1–6 record and 4.47 ERA with 42 strikeouts in 46.1 innings of work. In 2019, Soriano split the year between the AZL Angels and Burlington, accumulating a 5–7 record and 2.51 ERA with 92 strikeouts in 82.0 innings pitched. On February 13, 2020, Soriano underwent Tommy John surgery, prematurely ending his 2020 season, which was later cancelled due to the COVID-19 pandemic.

The Pittsburgh Pirates selected Soriano from the Angels in the 2020 Rule 5 draft. On February 17, 2021, Soriano was placed on the 60-day injured list. Soriano pitched to a 14.73 ERA in 2 games tor the High-A Bradenton Marauders before suffering an injury. On June 15, Soriano underwent Tommy John surgery for the second time in his career. After the 2021 season, the Pirates returned Soriano to the Angels.

Soriano was optioned to the Double-A Rocket City Trash Pandas to start the 2023 season.

Eric Torres

Eric Anthony Torres (born September 22, 1999) is an American professional baseball pitcher in the Los Angeles Angels organization.

Torres attended Sussex Hamilton High School in Sussex, Wisconsin, and played college baseball at Kansas State University. In 2019, he played collegiate summer baseball with the Wareham Gatemen of the Cape Cod Baseball League. In 2020, he played in the Northwoods League for the Green Bay Booyah. As a redshirt sophomore at Kansas State in 2021, Torres went 4-0 with a 2.75 ERA, 58 strikeouts, and nine walks over  innings pitched. After the season, he was selected by the Los Angeles Angels in the 14th round with the 411th overall selection of the 2021 Major League Baseball draft.

Torres made his professional debut with the Tri-City Dust Devils and gave up five earned runs over  innings. He played the 2022 season with the Rocket City Trash Pandas. Over 42 relief appearances, he went 2-2 with a 1.59 ERA and 81 strikeouts over 51 innings, and was third in the minor leagues with 22 saves.

Kansas State Wildcats bio

Full Triple-A to Rookie League rosters

Triple-A

Double-A

High-A

Single-A

Rookie

Foreign Rookie

References 

Minor league players
Los Angeles A